Gustavo Giagnoni (23 March 1932 – 7 August 2018) was an Italian professional footballer and coach. He played as a defender.

As a player, he started his career with hometown side Olbia Calcio. He went on to spend a decade playing as a sweeper for Mantova and three seasons at Reggiana.

Giagnoni died on 7 August 2018, at the age of 86.

Honours

Player
Mantova
Serie C (1): 1958–59

Manager
Mantova
Serie B (1): 1970–71
Serie C2: (1): 1992–93

Individual
Torino F.C. Hall of Fame: 2018

References

1932 births
2018 deaths
Association football midfielders
People from Olbia
Italian footballers
Serie A players
Serie B players
Serie C players
Olbia Calcio 1905 players
A.C. Reggiana 1919 players
Mantova 1911 players
Italian football managers
Torino F.C. managers
A.C. Milan managers
Bologna F.C. 1909 managers
A.S. Roma managers
Delfino Pescara 1936 managers
Udinese Calcio managers
Cagliari Calcio managers
Palermo F.C. managers
Footballers from Sardinia